Fier-Seman is a small village in the Fier County, western Albania. It is part of the former municipality Gradishtë. At the 2015 local government reform it became part of the municipality Divjakë.

References

Populated places in Divjakë
Villages in Fier County